Samuel Fischer (born July 5, 1991) is an Australian pop rock singer-songwriter and musician. Fischer released music independently before signing with RCA Records in 2019. RCA re-released his debut EP Not a Hobby in January 2020.

Life and career

Early life
Fischer was born outside of Sydney in 1991 and grew up on a farm in the town of Grose Vale, just outside Sydney, Australia. His musical life began at age three when he started playing violin after being inspired by seeing a performance by Queenie. He moved with his family to Sydney when he was seven, and at age 10 took up the saxophone, later playing in his high school jazz band. By age 12, he was writing songs, learning to do so after listening to Human Nature's self-titled album (which included songs such as He Don't Love You, When We Were Young and Don't Come Back) which his parents had bought for him. He attended Sydney Grammar School and later the Conservatorium High School in Sydney. In 2010 he was accepted to Berklee College of Music in Boston, and moved to that city to study music. He is classically trained on saxophone and violin. At Berklee he joined the a cappella troupe Pitch Slapped and was a member when the group won the International Championship of Collegiate A Cappella in 2014.

2012–present: Not a Hobby
Fischer's debut release was as a featured artist on Alex Preston's single "Heartbeats" in July 2012. In September 2014, after graduating from Berklee, Fischer moved to Los Angeles, where he was active in the local a cappella scene and sang backing vocals for the band HOLYCHILD while writing songs and aiming for success as an artist on his own.

In May 2016, Fischer released his first single "Lean". The following year he released the singles "Same Friends", which premiered at Billboard on 10 November 2017 and "Getting Older". Fischer featured on Opia's single "Secrets".

In January 2018, Fischer released his debut EP, Not a Hobby. In May 2018, Fischer released a second EP titled Sam Fischer (Our Vinyl Sessions), featuring acoustic recordings of "Getting Older", "Same Friends" and "Lean". In January 2019, Fischer collaboration with London's Black Saint on "Everybody Wants You" which became a dance in mid-2019. The same year, he toured with Lewis Capaldi. Later in 2019, Fischer was signed by RCA Records who re-released "This City" in December 2019 and re-released Not a Hobby EP in January 2020. Not a Hobby peaked at number 15 on the Australian Artist Singles Chart on 9 March 2020.

Fischer has worked with a variety of producers and has written songs for artists including Ciara ("Dose"), Elle King, Sabrina Claudio, Keith Urban, MAX, Christian French, Andy Grammer, Saygrace, and Jessie J.

In February 2021, Fischer released "What Other People Say", a collaboration with American singer, Demi Lovato. The track went on to peak within the top 100 in multiple regions, including the United Kingdom, at 70, and Australia, at 58, as well as within the top 20 in Scotland. The song was subsequently included on Lovato's seventh studio album, Dancing with the Devil... The Art of Starting Over.

In September 2022, Fischer returned to Australia for the first time since the COVID-19 pandemic, opening as a support act for British singer Mimi Webb on her tour of the country and New Zealand.

Discography

Extended plays

Singles

As lead artist

As featured artist

Promotional singles

Awards and nominations

ARIA Music Awards

The ARIA Music Awards are a series of annual awards, which recognise excellence, innovation, and achievement across all genres of Australian music.

! 
|-
| 2020
| "This City"
| Song of the Year
| 
| 
|-
| 2021
| "What Other People Say" 
| Song of the Year
| 
| 

|-

Notes

References

External links
 

1991 births
Living people
21st-century Australian singers
21st-century Australian male singers
Australian pop singers
Australian male singer-songwriters
Musicians from Sydney